Pallantla is a village located in Deverapllai mandal in West Godavari district in the state of Andhra Pradesh, India. It is located in Devarapalle mandal in Kovvur revenue division.

Demographics 

 Census of India, Pallantali had a population of 4706. The total population constitute, 2386 males and 2320 females with a sex ratio of 972 females per 1000 males. 488 children are in the age group of 0–6 years, with sex ratio of 984. The average literacy rate stands at 70.32%.

About Pallantla 
Famous for Red Chili's and cashew nuts and mango cultivation. Different types of soils helps farmers cultivate various crops. Pallantla village was 5 km radius to Devarapalli Town to connect to Highway. Nearest Airport will be Rajhamundry and next Vijayawada. Nidadavolu and Kovvur and Rajhamundry will be nearest Railway station.

Urbanization 
Sub-station that supplies power to the village.
Water Supply.
Transport Facility.

References 

Villages in West Godavari district